Ab Kuleh Sar-e Kuchak (also Romanized as Āb Kūleh Sar-e Kūchak; also known as Āb Kalleh Sar-e Kūchak) is a village in Mir Shams ol Din Rural District, in the Central District of Tonekabon County, Mazandaran Province, Iran. At the 2006 census, its population was 362, in 104 families.

References 

Populated places in Tonekabon County